Sawadaea tulasnei is a form of powdery mildew is a species of fungus in the family Erysiphaceae.

This fungus attacks the leaves of the Acer platanoides (Norway maple) in North America, and in Great Britain and/or Ireland, Acer palmatum (also known as the Japanese Maple or Smooth Japanese Maple).

Synonyms 
 Erysiphe varium Fr. 1822
 Uncinula aceris var. tulasnei (Fuckel) E. S. Salmon 1900
 Uncinula bicornis var. tulasnei (Fuckel) W. B. Cooke 1952
 Uncinula tulasnei Fuckel 1866

References 

Erysiphales
Fungal tree pathogens and diseases
Fungi described in 1937